Iran's Pirooz appears to resemble Russia's Kornet-D, an anti-tank missile carrier currently in service with the Russian military. The Pirooz consists of four missile launchers mounted on a remote controlled weapon station that can be lowered into a roadside position inside the vehicle. The Pirooz can launch the "Dehlavieh" missile, which is a copy of the Russian Kornet 9M113 ATGM (Anti-Tank Guided Missile).

An automatic electro-optical tracking system with a laser range finder and observation systems was installed in the center of the tower. The Pirooz is capable of destroying all types of ground targets with a maximum range of 5,000m, but can also be used against air targets with a maximum range of 1,800m. 

The Pirooz vehicle has a crew of two, and all shooting operations can be performed from inside the vehicle. The weapon platform easily integrates with many types of armored and tactical vehicles. The weapon system can be quickly mounted on the vehicle's roof to engage self-tracking ground and air targets.

Iranian self-tracking version of the Kornet anti-tank guided missile, allowing the use of short-range air defenses

Iran unveils new Pirooz anti-tank guided missile at IQDEX Iraq Defense Exhibition

References 

Anti-tank guided missiles of Iran